The Philippines–Qatar relations refers to the bilateral relationship between the Republic of the Philippines and State of Qatar

History

Diplomatic relations between the Philippines and Qatar formally began on May 5, 1981. The Philippines maintained relations with Qatar through its embassy in the United Arab Emirates until May 1992, when it opened an embassy in Doha

Economic relations
Qatar serves as the third-largest destination for Overseas Filipino Workers (OFW). There are approximately 250,000 OFW's staying in Qatar or about 17 percent of Qatar's 2.7 million population. A number of them are employed in construction, tourism, information technology, telecommunications, hotels, banks, and as domestic helpers. There are also 44 Filipino organisations in Doha.

See also 
 Foreign relations of the Philippines
 Foreign relations of Qatar

References

Qatar
Bilateral relations of Qatar